Cinemark Holdings, Inc. (stylized as CineMark from 1998 to 2022 and CINEMARK since 2022) is an American movie theater chain that started operations in 1984 and since then it has operated theaters with hundreds of locations throughout the Americas and in Central America. It is headquartered in Plano, Texas, in the Dallas–Fort Worth area. Cinemark is a leader in the theatrical exhibition industry with 521 theatres and 5,855 screens in the U.S. and Latin America as of June 30, 2022. It is the largest movie theatre chain in Brazil, with a 30 percent market share.

Cinemark operates theaters under several brands, including its flagship Cinemark, Century Theatres, Tinseltown, CinéArts and Rave Cinemas.

In May 2021, Cinemark struck agreements to show films from some of its major Hollywood studio partners, including Warner Bros., Walt Disney Studios, Paramount, and Sony. The goal of the move is to establish how long movies will play in theaters before being available for home video.

History

Cinemark was started by Lee Roy Mitchell as a chain of theatres in California, Texas and Utah. It is unclear when Cinemark was first founded. While Cinemark officially claims to have launched in 1984 (and previously claimed a 1983 founding date), online records show Cinemark might have started as early as 1977. The roots of the company date back to the 1960s when brothers J.C. and Lee Roy Mitchell created Mitchell Theatres, Inc. By 1972, the company was named Texas Cinema Corporation. Lee Roy Mitchell then formed a group of theaters under the Cinemark name beginning in 1977. Cinemark Corporation and Texas Cinema Corporation merged operations in June 1979 creating a portfolio of 25 theaters in Texas and New Mexico under the Cinemark brand. On March 26, 1980, Henry G. Plitt of Plitt Theatres Holdings purchased the Cinemark circuit of theaters. But Cinemark Corporation continued operations acquiring existing theaters and began to build new theaters. In 1987, Cinemark acquired all of the Plitt Theatres.

With the opening of the Movies 8 on 3912 Hampton Road in Texarkana, Texas in 1987, Cinemark began building theaters with colorful interiors and large video game arcades. Legal advertisements indicate that the company known as Cinemark USA, Incorporated, officially began December 31, 1987. The following year, Cinemark introduced its Front Row Joe mascot created by independent animation studio Wilming Reams Animation. This animated cat appeared in policy trailers and on kids' concession products. The mascot was retired in 1998 when Cinemark had begun to open Art Deco-style theatres, and was revived in 2004 for its 20th anniversary, and again in 2018 with a CGI look, darker orange color and the beige color being added. In 1992, Cinemark opened a new theater concept called Hollywood USA in Garland, Texas; this concept was subsequently refined into the Tinseltown USA brand of theaters, which were much bigger than what Cinemark had previously built. The following year, Cinemark expanded to Latin America with the opening of a theater in Santiago, Chile. The next year, Cinemark opened four theaters in Mexico. In 1998, Cinemark announced that it would replace its bright color interiors with what Cinemark characterized as a more classic Art Deco design. Through new theatre construction and acquisitions, it became the third largest theatre chain in the United States and the second largest theatre chain in the world. Mitchell's son Kevin Mitchell worked with the company as an executive until leaving in 2007 to found ShowBiz Cinemas. In 2013, Cinemark decided to sell all of its Mexican theaters to Cinemex.

Cinemark has a deal with Universal in which movies that gross more than $50 million domestically during their first weekend in theaters will continue to be shown in theaters exclusively for five weekends, or 31 days. After that, while theaters can continue to screen a film, the title becomes available on online rental platforms such as Apple TV and Amazon Prime Video.

Cinemark introduced a brand new premium offering, Cinemark XD, standing for Extreme Digital Cinema in 2009. The first XD screen opened at the Century San Francisco Centre 9 theater in San Francisco, California. This auditorium features a giant, wall-to-wall display, Barco 4K digital projection with 2D and RealD 3D capabilities, immersive, surround sound audio systems that enabled customers to hear the movies as the filmmakers intended and premium seats with Luxury Lounger electric recliners. Special features include 11.1 layers of multi-layer channel surround sound and 35 trillion colors. On May 4, 2017, it was announced that a THX sound system would be coming to the XD locations as part of a partnership with Cinemark. The Razer-owned company was hired to certify over 200 XD auditoriums in the United States and Latin America to offer a superior audiovisual experience for moviegoers and provide an unparalleled entertainment environment. It took a year to finish the certification update. Finally on May 2, 2018, Cinemark confirmed that the XD screens were now THX certified as the progress was completed.

United States Department of Justice lawsuits
In the 1990s, Cinemark Theatres was one of the first chains to incorporate stadium-style seating into their theatres.  In 1997, several disabled individuals filed a lawsuit against Cinemark, alleging that their stadium style seats forced patrons who used wheelchairs to sit in the front row of the theatre, effectively rendering them unable to see the screen without assuming a horizontal position. The case was heard in El Paso district court as Lara v. Cinemark USA, where a judge ruled that the architecture of Cinemark's theatres violated the Americans with Disabilities Act (ADA). The ruling was later overturned by the Fifth Circuit Court of Appeals, which ruled that Cinemark only had to provide an "unobstructed view" of the screen, and that since disabled patrons' view was only awkward and not actually obscured, Cinemark was not violating the law.

In response, the United States Department of Justice (DOJ) filed their own suit against Cinemark while appealing the appellate court's decision. The DOJ argued that, while Cinemark was not technically violating the ADA, it was nevertheless discriminating against disabled patrons by relegating them to the worst seats in the auditorium. Cinemark responded by filing a lawsuit against the Department of Justice, alleging misconduct on the DOJ's behalf. Cinemark's lawsuit was thrown out, and the Department of Justice proceeded with its lawsuit. Cinemark ultimately agreed to settle out of court before the court came to a ruling, agreeing with the DOJ that it was in the company's best interest to end litigation before a ruling was issued. Per the terms of the settlement, Cinemark agreed to renovate all existing theatres to provide patrons who used wheelchairs access to rows higher in its theatres, and also agreed that all future theatres would be constructed so as to allow handicapped patrons better access to higher rows. In turn, the Department of Justice agreed not to bring further litigation against the company in relation to the architecture of stadium seating as it applies to the ADA.

Aurora shooting

On July 20, 2012, a gunman opened fire during the midnight premiere of The Dark Knight Rises in a Century theater in Aurora, Colorado, killing 12 people and injuring 70 others. The gunman, later identified as James Eagan Holmes, who was believed to be acting alone, entered the theater dressed in protective clothing, set off tactical grenades, then opened fire with multiple firearms on the theatergoers. Counting both fatalities and injuries, the attack was the largest mass shooting in terms of number of casualties in United States history at the time. The theater was reopened on January 17, 2013.

The theater was sued by families of the victims, who alleged the theater should have taken greater measures to prevent the shooting. In May 2016, after years of legal debate, a jury took three hours to deliver a unanimous verdict that the theater chain was not liable to any degree for the tragedy that transpired. As the prevailing party in the judgment, Cinemark sought nearly US$700,000 from the plaintiffs to recover litigation expenses. In September 2016, after objections from the victims, Cinemark dropped all claims for reimbursement of legal fees. A separate group of victims were also dismissed in federal court when US District Judge R. Brooke Jackson ruled: "[James Holmes'] own premeditated and intentional actions were the predominant cause of the plaintiffs' losses."

2020 temporary closure
Effective March 18, 2020, Cinemark closed all of its 345 theaters across the United States indefinitely due to the COVID-19 pandemic. Cinemark released a statement describing the temporary closure "as a proactive measure in support of the health and safety of its employees, guests and communities." In light of the pandemic, a few dozen locations have upgraded their box office stands, replacing them with digital kiosks for ticket purchases, including the lay offs of many ushers working up front-end. Another reason is due to the plunging revenue in Q3 2020. The process of entirely replacing ushers with kiosks, has been pushed back to January 1, 2028.

In May 2021, CEO Mark Zoradi said that 98 percent of Cinemark's theaters in the United States had reopened. Due to government restrictions in Latin America, only half of the theaters the region are operating More recently, the company signed a new deal with the major movie studios.

Political causes

In 2008, CEO Alan Stock donated US$9,999 toward the successful passage of California's Proposition 8, an initiative restricting the definition of marriage to opposite-sex couples and overturning the California Supreme Court's ruling that same-sex couples have a constitutional right to marry. An ensuing campaign, launched by opponents to the Prop 8 passage, encouraged patrons to see showings of the film Milk, based on the life of gay-rights activist Harvey Milk, at a competing theater in protest instead of at Cinemark showings. Others called for a more general boycott.

Theater chains acquired

Century Theatres acquisition
On August 8, 2006, Cinemark purchased Century Theatres with a combination of cash and stock bonds. This acquisition added over 80 theatres and many more screens. Some of these theatres were subsequently shut down either being phased out as under performing or replaced with new complexes. The transaction was completed on October 5, 2006. With this purchase, Cinemark heavily strengthened their presence in Northern California and entered Alaska, Nevada, South Dakota, and Washington state, though at the transaction both of their locations in Washington state were still under construction. However, Cinemark retains the Century banner and continues to open new locations under that banner.

Muvico Theaters purchases
In 2009, in order to save the company from a potential bankruptcy, Muvico Theaters sold four theatres to Cinemark: Arundel Mills Egyptian 24 in Hanover, Maryland; Paradise 24 in Pembroke Pines, Florida; Palace 20 in Boca Raton, Florida; and Boynton Beach 14 in Boynton Beach, Florida. Muvico was bought by another theater chain (Carmike Cinemas) in 2013, which was bought by yet another (AMC Theatres) in 2016.

Rave Cinemas purchase
In November 2012, Cinemark announced it was acquiring Rave Cinemas, the Dallas, Texas–based chain that operates the former Bridge theater with IMAX in Culver City, California for US$240 million. The deal included 32 theaters located in 12 US states, representing 483 screens. Tim Warner, Cinemark's CEO said in a statement "The acquisition of these high quality assets will further enhance Cinemark's diversified domestic footprint, including the expansion of our presence in the New England market". The sale was closed on May 29, 2013, but Cinemark was required to sell the Rave Stonybrook 20 + IMAX theater in Louisville, Kentucky, the Rave Ritz Center 16 in southern New Jersey, and either the Rave Hickory Creek 16 in Hickory Creek, Texas or the Cinemark 14 in Denton, Texas. In addition, Cinemark's chairman Lee Roy Mitchell was also required to sell the Movie Tavern Inc. to Southern Theatres. On July 18, 2013, Cinemark found a buyer, Carmike Cinemas, for the Stonybrook 20 & IMAX, Rave Ritz Center 16, and the Rave Hickory Creek 16. With this change, National CineMedia has been replaced with Screenvision at the Stonybrook 20 and Ritz Center 16. Screenvision is already at Hickory Creek, Texas at the time of the announcement of the sale. The sale was closed on August 16, 2013. On September 12, 2013, Southern Theatres announced that they acquired The Movie Tavern from Lee Roy Mitchell after he was required to sell The Movie Tavern after Cinemark bought Rave Cinemas on May 29, 2013. In 2018, Southern sold the Movie Tavern chain to the Marcus Corporation. As part of Southern Theatres' long-term deal with National CineMedia, The Movie Tavern switched from Screenvision to National CineMedia in June 2014. Also, Cinemark purchased Rave Cinemas Baldwin Hills Crenshaw 15, in Los Angeles, in June 2014.

See also 
 AMC Theatres
 Regal Cinemas

References

External links

 
Cinemark Sweepstakes

Movie theatre chains in the United States
Movie theatre chains in Canada
American companies established in 1984
Entertainment companies established in 1984
1984 establishments in Texas
Companies based in Plano, Texas
Companies listed on the New York Stock Exchange
2007 initial public offerings